Tanase may refer to:
 the Romanian name and surname Tănase
 Tănase River, a river in Romania
 Tanasi, a Cherokee town near present-day Vonore, Tennessee